The Tesla Model X is a battery electric mid-size luxury crossover SUV produced by Tesla, Inc. since 2015. Developed from the full-sized sedan platform of the Tesla Model S, the vehicle is notable in that it uses falcon-wing doors for passenger access.

The Model X has an EPA size class as an SUV, and shares around 30 percent of its content with the Model S, half of the originally planned 60 percent, and weighs about 10 percent more. Both the Model X and Model S are produced at the Tesla Factory in Fremont, California. The prototype was unveiled at Tesla's design studios in Hawthorne, California on February 9, 2012. First deliveries of the Model X began in September 2015. After one full year on the market, in 2016, the Model X ranked seventh among the world's best-selling plug-in cars.

Both come with Tesla's Autopilot driver assistance system.

History
Initially, Tesla planned for deliveries to commence in early 2014. However, in February 2013, the company announced that deliveries had been rescheduled to begin by late 2014 in order to achieve its production target of 20,000 Model S cars in 2013.  In November 2013, Tesla said it expected to begin Model X high volume production the second quarter of 2015. In November 2014, Tesla again delayed and announced that Model X deliveries would begin in the third quarter of 2015. Deliveries began on September 29, 2015. Among the reasons for delay were problems with the falcon-wing doors and cooling the motors when hauling trailers.

In 2016, the company filed a lawsuit against Swiss hydraulics firm Hoerbiger Holding for not producing satisfactory falcon-wing doors for the Model X. Tesla claimed the doors suffered from oil leakage and overheating. Many believe this is one of the reasons for the delay of the Model X. The lawsuit was settled in September 2016.

On July 13, 2016, Tesla introduced its Model X 60D, which is slightly lower priced than the Model X's starting price. The battery capacity in the Model X 60D is 75 kWh but has been software restricted to 60 kWh. Post purchase, owners have the option to unlock the additional 15 kWh, bringing the 60D to 75D range specifications.

Global sales passed the 10,000 unit mark in August 2016, with most cars delivered in the United States. In October 2016 Tesla discontinued the 60D version and made the "Smart Air Suspension" standard instead of coil springs, increasing the base price to $85,000. In June 2017, the 90D version was discontinued.

In August 2017, Tesla announced that HW2.5 included a secondary processor node to provide more computing power and additional wiring redundancy to slightly improve reliability; it also enabled dashcam and sentry mode capabilities.

In March 2018 it was announced that Tesla upgraded the MCU to version 2.  MCU 2 improved the performance of the 17 inch center console screen.

Global cumulative sales since inception totaled 106,689 units through September 2018.

In January 2019, Tesla discontinued the 75D version, making the 100D the base version of the Model X. The base price of the Model X 100D is $97,000 as of Jan 2019. In July 2019, Tesla added a Long Range model of the Model X with a 325-mile EPA range priced at $84,500.

Starting from 2020, modified Tesla Model X (with umbilical for the astronauts) were used to transport astronauts, especially for SpaceX Commercial Crew Program missions from NASA, for examples:

 Crew Dragon Demo-2 – the two vehicles used had the NASA meatball logos on the driver and passenger doors, while the Worm logos were on the upper part of the rear window, and have special license plates, dubbed ISSBND for "ISS Bound".
SpaceX Crew-1 – the three vehicles used had same characteristics as Demo-2 except for the special license plates, dubbed L8RERTH for "see you later, Earth".
SpaceX Crew-2 – the three vehicles used had no NASA logos (both meatball and worm) and have special license plates, each of them dubbed "REDUCE", "REUSE", and "RECYCLE", since the mission was originally scheduled on Earth Day.
SpaceX Crew-3 – all three vehicles had the NASA worm logo on the doors painted in grey. The meatball logo was on the rear windshield. The license plates on all of them read "S3ND IT" for "SEND IT".

Design

A series production vehicle was unveiled on September 29, 2015. It has a panoramic windshield. According to Tesla CEO Elon Musk, it is the safest SUV in terms of frontal and side impact crash, being more than twice as safe as the next closest SUV in rollover tests as well. The Model X does come with Autopilot as standard, and has an optional full self-driving system. The Model X has standard a collision avoidance system that uses radar-based autonomous emergency braking (AEB) and side-directed ultrasound detection that steers the car away from threats. Tesla uses a wide-band radar system to help prevent the falcon wing doors from hitting nearby objects when opening or closing.

The Model X has double-hinged falcon wing doors which open upwards, allowing the leading edge of the door to remain tucked close to the body, unlike traditional gull-wing doors. Tesla claims the falcon-wing (modified gull-wing) doors ease access to the vehicle by having the door raise up vertically, rather than swinging out hinged at the front, which tremendously reduces accessibility. The Model X offers room for seven adults and their luggage in three rows of seating and front and rear trunks.

As of mid 2021 it's the largest fully electric SUV in terms of exterior dimensions.

Specifications

The Model X weighs about 8% more than the Model S and shares about 30% of its parts content – down from around 60% expected when development began. The cargo space is 87.8 ft³.

Over the years, the Model X has been available with four lithium-ion battery packs, rated at either 60, 75, 90, or 100 kW·h. The Model X's all-wheel-drive system uses two motors (one for the front and the other for the rear wheels), unlike conventional AWD systems that have a single source of power.

The company planned to offer rear-wheel-drive models, but instead all models use all-wheel drive. The standard AWD has  on both the front and rear motors, while the performance edition has  front and  rear.  With an optional towbar, the Model X has a towing capacity of up to 5000 lb or 2250 kg. At the  towing speed limit in California, a Model X may have 70% of the  EPA-registered range when pulling a  travel trailer.

Energy consumption

The following table shows the EPA's official ratings for fuel economy in miles per gallon gasoline equivalent (MPGe) for the variants of the Model X rated  and as displayed in the Monroney label.

Production and sales

Tesla started taking reservations for the Model X in February 2012 without announcing prices. The standard Model X required a  deposit, while the limited time production Signature model required a  deposit in 2013. More than 20,000 Model Xs had been reserved by September 2014. In August 2015, user groups estimated around 30,000 Model X pre-orders had been received, compared to 12,000 for the Model S.

The first six Founders Series models were delivered at a market launch event in the Fremont factory on September 29, 2015. The first Signature edition was delivered on December 18, 2015.

After the first quarter of 2016 all Tesla Model X deliveries had gone to US customers. Nevertheless, in January 2016 a Tesla car other than the Model S was registered in Germany and a Tesla Model X was sighted driving there with a license plate from Ingolstadt. Since the Audi headquarters are located in Ingolstadt, this led to speculation that Audi has acquired a Tesla Model X as part of its effort to develop its own battery-electric SUV.

Tesla produced 507 Model X in the fourth quarter of 2015, of which 206 were delivered to customers. Model X sales totaled 2,400 units during the first quarter of 2016. According to Tesla Motors, deliveries were lower than expected because production was impacted by severe Model X supplier parts shortages in the first two months of 2016, and because Tesla had been too ambitious in wanting advanced features (committed "hubris"). The first Model X that didn't need corrections was made in April 2016.

Sales during the second quarter of 2016 totaled 4,638 units. Although production was up 20% from the previous quarter, the number of vehicles in transit at the end of June 2016 was much higher than expected (5,150 including Model S cars), representing 35.8% of the number of cars delivered in the quarter (14,402 vehicles including the Model S). Global sales passed the 10,000 unit mark in August 2016. A total of 8,774 units were delivered in the third quarter of 2016, totaling 15,812 Model X cars sold during the first nine months of 2016.

The Model X ranked as the top-selling plug-in electric car in Norway in September 2016. However, when Volkswagen Golf nameplate registrations are broken down by each variant's powertrain, the all-electric e-Golf registered 392 units, the Golf GTE plug-in hybrid 358, and the internal combustion-powered Golf only 242 units. Therefore, the Model X also ranked as the top-selling new car model in September 2016. Norway was the world's first country to have all-electric cars topping the new car sales monthly ranking. Previously, the Model S had been the top-selling new car four times, and the Nissan Leaf twice.

According to Tesla, with 5,428 units sold in the U.S. in the third quarter of 2016, the Model X captured a 6% market share of the luxury SUV market segment, outselling Porsche and Land Rover, but behind seven SUV models manufactured by Mercedes, BMW, Cadillac, Volvo, Audi, and Lexus. With an estimated 9,500 units delivered worldwide during the fourth quarter of 2016, global sales in 2016 totaled 25,312 Model X cars, allowing the Model X to rank seventh among the world's top ten best-selling plug-in cars just in its first full year in the market.

, cumulative sales totaled 25,524 units since its inception. The United States is its main country market with 18,240 units delivered through December 2016, of which, an estimated 18,028 Model X vehicles were delivered during 2016, making the electric SUV the third best-selling plug-in electric in the American market that year after the Tesla Model S and the Chevrolet Volt. Registrations in California totaled 6,289 units in 2016, representing a 7.0% market share of the state's luxury mid-size SUV segment, ranking as the fifth best-selling car in this class, which was led by the Lexus RX with 20,070 units. Retail deliveries in China began in June 2016, and a total of 4,065 Model X vehicles were sold in 2016.

Global sales totaled about 11,550 units during the first quarter of 2017. A severe production shortfall of 100 kWh battery packs limited the second quarter of 2017 global deliveries to just about 10,000 Model X vehicles, with a slight increase to 11,865 vehicles during the third quarter of 2017. An additional 13,120 units were delivered in the fourth quarter of 2017, for total annual deliveries of 46,535 units globally. , cumulative sales since inception totaled about 72,059 units. Global sales during the first nine months of 2018 totaled 34,630 units, allowing the Model X to pass the 100,000 milestone in September 2018, with 106,689 units delivered since inception. 

On April 30, 2019, 5 Model X 75Ds were bought and operated by Blue Bird Group for their premium taxi service, Silver Bird, in Indonesia.

Reception
Consumer Reports wrote that the all-wheel-drive Model X 90D largely disappoints, as rear doors are prone to pausing and stopping, the second-row seats that cannot be folded, and the cargo capacity is too limited. Even its panoramic, helicopter-like windshield was disapproved of as it is not tinted enough to offset the brightness of a sunny day. Also, Consumer Reports added that overall "the ride is too firm and choppy for a $110,000 car".

Car and Driver, despite some criticism of the Model X's falcon wing doors, approved of the panoramic windshield, stating "We were left dumbfounded, like slack-jawed tourists endlessly looking upward. Lose the Falcon Wing doors, Elon; the windshield is the Model X's best gimmick". Overall, it was given a rating of 5/5 stars, stating "There are no other electric SUVs at the moment. And even against fossil-fuel-fed SUVs, the Tesla's effortless performance and efficiency can't be matched."

Motoring journalist Jeremy Clarkson's made his first review of a Tesla vehicle after 10 years on his TV show The Grand Tour in February 2018; Clarkson gave a positive review of the car that he called "fabulous" that is unlike anything on the road. Lawyers were present during the review presumably because Clarkson's previous scathing review of the original Roadster caused a lawsuit.

The 2016 Model X was named one of the top ten tech cars in 2016 by IEEE Spectrum.

Awards
 On November 16, 2015, the Tesla Model X was chosen as AutoGuide.com's 2016 Reader's Choice Green Car of the Year and Luxury Utility Vehicle of the Year awards. The model was noted for its falcon-wing doors, long range, efficiency, and acceleration.
 On November 8, 2016, the Model X was awarded the Golden Steering Wheel, one of the most prestigious automotive awards in the world, in the "Large SUV" category. Candidates for this award are nominated by hundreds of thousands across Europe for excellence across six categories. The Golden Steering Wheel jury, composed of professional race car drivers, accomplished technicians, editors, designers, and digital and connectivity experts, then spent three days judging Model X.
 On April 18, 2017, the American Automobile Association named the Tesla Model X 75D its Top Green Vehicle overall, as well as best in the SUV/Minivan category, with a score of 100/130. The vehicle scored 10/10 for its EPA Emissions Score, crashworthiness, Fuel Economy and Luggage Capacity. Though ambivalent toward Autopilot and the Model X's glass roof, AAA favoured its falcon-wing doors, and approved of the vehicle's performance, stating that its "acceleration is smooth and strong, as is the braking."
 On June 8, 2017, the Model X was awarded the Australian Good Design Award in the Automotive and Transport category. The design of the vehicle was described as "set with an athletic build, whilst remaining proportional. Delivering on the functional form of a cross between SUV and people mover, the design remains true to a sports SUV."
 On December 11, 2017, Forbes named the Model X 100D Best Vehicle of the Year stating that "Tesla makes every internal combustion vehicle on the highway seem a clunky, clumsy relic of the 20th century."

Guinness World Record
On May 15, 2018, the Tesla Model X and Qantas set the Guinness World Record for "heaviest tow by an electric production passenger vehicle."

Issues with production units 
The Tesla Model X faced criticism in 2016 for issues with the falcon-wing doors, which sometimes did not open or latch properly in some early production units, and the windows, which sometimes did not open or close all the way. Tesla addressed these issues with several software updates, and no known issues remained after the 8.0 firmware was released. On June 27, 2016, Tesla settled on a lawsuit over usability concerns, accepting that the Model X was rushed to production before it was ready, and by October 2016, Tesla claimed the problems had been reduced by 92%.

In 2017 Chinese newspaper Xinhua reported that security researchers from Keen Security Lab at Tencent were able to remotely gain control of the Tesla Model X, allowing them to remotely open the car's doors, blink the lights and control their brakes. They found zero day vulnerabilities that allowed them to install new firmware. The lead researcher for the team said they informed Tesla of the findings and most of the cars were patched by an update one month after Tesla was made aware of issues.

Recalls 
, Tesla has had four product safety recalls the Model X.
 On April 11, 2016, Tesla voluntarily recalled 2,700 Model X due to safety concerns. During collision testing, it was found that the third-row seats would unlatch and fold over to the second row. Tesla urged customers to avoid using the third-row seats until after repairs.
 On April 20, 2017, Tesla issued a worldwide recall of 53,000 (~70%) of the 76,000 Model S and Model X vehicles it sold in 2016 due to faulty parking brakes that affect the Model S and Model X. The recall caused Tesla stock to lose two percent of its value and added further questions about the reliability of Tesla's vehicles.
 In October 2017, Tesla issued an 11,000 vehicle recall for a faulty locking cable mechanism in the second row seats, estimating that about 3% of recalled vehicles may be affected.
 In February 2020, 15,000 vehicles recalled due to potential power steering issues.

Safety

NHTSA
On June 13, 2017, the National Highway Traffic Safety Administration announced its crash testing results for the 2017-manufactured Tesla Model X, revealing 5-star ratings in all assessed categories, the only SUV to have done so. Tesla attributed the ratings to safety-focused design, in addition to a low centre-of-gravity resulting from its battery pack, adding "More than just resulting in a 5-star rating, the data from NHTSA's testing shows that Model X has the lowest probability of injury of any SUV it has ever tested. In fact, of all the cars NHTSA has ever tested, Model X's overall probability of injury was second only to Model S."

Euro NCAP
The Model X has been tested and received five stars from Euro NCAP, but hasn't been tested by the Insurance Institute for Highway Safety.

See also
 Electric car use by country
 Government incentives for plug-in electric vehicles
 List of modern production plug-in electric vehicles
 List of production battery electric vehicles
 Audi e-tron (2018)
 Jaguar I-Pace
 Mercedes-Benz EQC
 Nissan Ariya
 List of Easter eggs in Tesla products
 Tesla Supercharger

References

External links 

 
 Model X – video of production
 Model X – emergency response guide

2020s cars
Automobiles with gull-wing doors
Cars introduced in 2015
Crossover sport utility vehicles
Electric car models
Electric cars
Full-size sport utility vehicles
Euro NCAP large off-road
Production electric cars
Model X